Orthrelm is an American avant-garde band from Washington, D.C.

Biography 
Orthrelm is a duo composed of Mick Barr on guitar and Josh Blair on drums. Their songwriting style is mostly experimental, and shows the influence of avant-garde music as well as shred guitar and minimalism.

Discography

Albums
 2nd 18/04 Norildivoth Crallos-Lomrixth Urthiln (2002; Three One G)
 OV (2005; Ipecac Recordings)

EPs
 Iorxhscimtor (2001, Tolotta Records)
 Orthrelm I (2001, self-released, 20 copies) / digital (2012, Orthrelm bandcamp)
 Orthrelm II (2001, self-released, 50 copies) / digital (2012, Orthrelm bandcamp)
 Asristir Vieldriox (2002, Troubleman Unlimited)
 Untitled 7" (2004, Forge)
 O-3 5" (2007, Soft Targets Journal)
 Orthrelm II II (2012, Orthrelm bandcamp) - previously unreleased 2001 demo
20012 (2012, Orthrelm bandcamp)

Compilation
 Untitled (2010, ugEXPLODE Records) - remastered/remixed old material

Split albums
 Touchdown/Orthrelm (2002, Troubleman)

Split EPs
 Orthrelm / Behold... The Arctopus (2006, Crucial Blast Releases)
 Orthrelm / Trencher - Trans Atlantic Asthma Attack (2005)

External links
 "Orthrelm" – Prog Archives

Heavy metal musical groups from Washington, D.C.